The  was an electric multiple unit (EMU) train type operated in Japan by the private railway operator Hankyu Railway since 1960. It was the recipient of the inaugural Laurel Prize presented by the Japan Railfan Club in 1961.

Variants
The 2000 series included the following types.
2021 series (later reclassified 2071 series)
2100 series

Interior
Passenger accommodation consisted of longitudinal bench seating throughout.

Withdrawal and resale
The 2100 series trains were withdrawn between 1983 and 1985, and four-car sets were sold to the Nose Electric Railway, classified as 1500 series. The 2000 series trains were withdrawn between 1989 and 1992, and four-car sets were sold to the Nose Electric Railway, classified as 1700 series.

References

Electric multiple units of Japan
2000 series
Train-related introductions in 1960
600 V DC multiple units
1500 V DC multiple units of Japan
Naniwa Koki rolling stock